Burton Callicott (1907–2003) was an American artist in Memphis, Tennessee and teacher at the Memphis Academy of Art, more recently known as the Memphis College of Art.  Callicott was one of the founders, in 1937, and served as Professor Emeritus into the 1980s.  He completed murals Pink Palace Museum and Planetarium, said to be the last of the WPA artwork extant in Memphis, Tennessee.

References

External links

1907 births
2003 deaths
People from Memphis, Tennessee
American muralists
Artists from Tennessee
20th-century American painters
American male painters
20th-century American male artists